This is a non-exhaustive list of mycologists, or scientists with a specialisation in mycology, with their author abbreviations. Because the study of lichens is traditionally considered a branch of mycology, lichenologists are included in this list.

Further reading

References

Bibliography

 
Mycology